Bolivia, Confederation Next is a short film directed  by Uruguayan media artist Martin Sastre in the year 2004 and the third part of his futuristic Iberoamerican Trilogy

Set in the year 2876, South America becomes a gigantic confederation named Bolivia while North America is made of small countries. Tom Cruise has become an immortal vampire living in the dark marshes which used to be Hollywood and the war for control of fiction started with a duel between Martin Sastre and Matthew Barney.

References

External links
Catalogue entry

2004 short films
Uruguayan short films